The 1950–51 Western Kentucky State Hilltoppers men's basketball team represented Western Kentucky State College (now known as Western Kentucky University) during the 1950-51 NCAA University Division Basketball season. The Hilltoppers were led by future Naismith Memorial Basketball Hall of Fame coach Edgar Diddle and All-Ohio Valley Conference player Rip Gish.  Gish also made the OVC Tournament team.  The team participated in the only National Campus Basketball Tournament.  This was a new tournament hosted by Bradley University in response to the ongoing point shaving scandal.  It was thought that hosting a tournament on a campus site would reduce the opportunity for such scandals.

Schedule

|-
!colspan=6| Regular Season

|-

 

|-
!colspan=6| 1951 Ohio Valley Conference Tournament

|-
!colspan=6| Regular Season

|-
!colspan=6| 1951 National Campus Basketball Tournament

References

Western Kentucky Hilltoppers basketball seasons
Western Kentucky State
Western Kentucky State Basketball, Men's
Western Kentucky State Basketball, Men's